Mogilev Region or Mogilev Oblast or Mahiliow Voblasts (Mahiloŭskaja voblasć; ; Mogilyovskaya Oblast), is a region (oblast) of Belarus with its administrative center at Mogilev (Mahilyow).

Both Mogilev and Gomel Regions suffered severely after the Chernobyl nuclear radioactive reactor catastrophe in April 1986.

Important cities within the region include Mogilev, Asipovichy and Babruysk.

Geography

Many rivers flow through the Mogilev Region including the Dnieper (Dniapro), Berezina, Sozh, Druts, Pronya and Ptsich.

The extreme eastern point of Belarus is situated within the Mogilev Region to the east of the Khotimsk District.

Climate
Mogilev Region has a temperate continental climate. The region has cold winters and warm summers. The region's average yearly vegetative period lasts around 183–194 days. The average precipitation is  a year with approximately 70% falling during the warm season (April–October).

Demographics
With a total population of 1,088,100 (2011), 353,600 inhabitants live in rural areas and 855,000 live in cities or towns. There are 639,300 women and 567,300 men in the region, of which 288,100 are under 18 while 267,300 are elderly people.

Of the major nationalities living in the Mogilev Region, 1,044,000 inhabitants are Belarusians, 132,000 are Russians, 3,500 are Jewish, 2,800 are Poles, 2,110 are Ukrainians, 1,700 are Tatars, 1,300 are Lithuanians, 1,100 are Armenians, and 1,070 are Romani.

Tourism
The number of travel agencies in Mogilev Region has grown from 20 in 2000 to 50 in 2010, 12 of which provide agent services, the others are tour operators. Mogilev Region hosts 3-4% of all the organized tourist arrivals to the Republic of Belarus. Most popular cities to visit in the region are Mogilev and Bobruisk.

Administrative subdivisions
Today the region consists of 21 districts (raions), 195 selsovets, 14 towns, 3 city municipalities, and 12 urban-type settlements.

Districts of Mogilev Region

The twenty-one raions (districts) of the Mogilev Region are:

 Asipovichy District
 Babruysk District
 Byalynichy District
 Bykhaw District
 Chavusy District
 Cherykaw District
 Drybin District
 Hlusk District
 Horki District
 Kastsyukovichy District
 Khotsimsk District
 Kirawsk District
 Klichaw District
 Klimavichy District
 Krasnapolle District
 Kruhlaye District
 Krychaw District
 Mogilev District
 Mstsislaw District
 Shklow District
 Slawharad District

Cities and towns
Population of cities and towns in Mogilev Region

See also
 Subdivisions of Belarus

References

External links

 Mogilev Regional Executive Committee

 
Regions of Belarus